Teliapsocus conterminus is a species of shaggy psocid in the family Dasydemellidae. It is found in North America.

References

External links

 

Caeciliusetae
Articles created by Qbugbot
Insects described in 1863